Hoseynabad-e Shamlu (also Romanized as Ḩoseynābād-e Shāmlū; also known as Ḩasanābād-e Shāmlū, Ḩoseynābād, and Hūsaīnābād) is a village in Almahdi Rural District, Jowkar District, Malayer County, Hamadan Province, Iran. At the 2006 census, its population was 2,215, in 613 families.

References 

Populated places in Malayer County